Heinz Lohmann (8 November 1934 in Gevelsberg – 11 March 2001 in Berlin) was a German organist, editor and composer.

Lohmann studied in Detmold and Paris. He worked as Kirchenmusikdirektor at the church Zum Heilsbronnen in Berlin. He gave concerts at home and abroad. His interpretations have been documented by radio and television recordings. He has composed works for choir, organ, chamber music and Lieder.

Recordings 
 Max Reger: Orgelwerke T. 7; Kirche zum Heilsbronnen (1980)
 Max Reger: Orgelwerke T. 8; Kirche zum Heilsbronnen (1980)
 Max Reger: Orgelwerke T. 11; Jesuitenkirche zu Mannheim (1973 / 1979)
 Max Reger: Orgelwerke T. 12; Jesuitenkirche zu Mannheim (1973 / 1978)
 Max Reger: Orgelwerke T. 13; Marktkirche zu Wiesbaden (1974 / 1978)
 Kostbarkeiten barocker Meister; (EMI-Electrola 1979 / 1980)
 Johann Sebastian Bach 1; Steinkirchen (1979)
 Johann Sebastian Bach 2; Altenbruch (1980)
 Johann Sebastian Bach 3; Martinikirche zu Minden (1983)
 Johann Sebastian Bach 4; Martinikirche zu Minden (1983)
 Lotte Backes: Orgelwerke (1977)
 Joseph Rheinberger: Orgelsonaten (1978)
 Organ concert from the island church St. Nikolai on Helgoland (1978)

Writings 
 Handbuch der Orgelliteratur. (Breitkopf und Härtel, 1975/ 1980)

Editions 
 Gesamtausgabe der Orgelwerke von Johann Sebastian Bach

References

External links 
 

Classical organists
20th-century German composers
1934 births
2001 deaths
Musicians from North Rhine-Westphalia
People from Ennepe-Ruhr-Kreis
Kirchenmusikdirektor